Iron Feathers is an outdoor 1990 sculpture by Rand Elliott, installed outside Oklahoma City's Will Rogers World Airport, in the U.S. state of Oklahoma. The steel pipe artwork was dedicated on April 13, 1990.

See also

 1990 in art

References

External links
 Iron Feathers, 1990 at Will Rogers World Airport
 Iron Feathers at cultureNOW
 Iron Feathers - Will Rogers World Airport - Oklahoma City, OK at Waymarking

1990 establishments in Oklahoma
1990 sculptures
Outdoor sculptures in Oklahoma City
Steel sculptures in the United States